Fritzi is a feminine given name and nickname, often a short form (hypocorism) of Friederike, which may refer to:

People
 Fritzi Brunette (1890–1943), American film actress
 Friederike Fritzi Burger (1910–1999), Austrian figure skater
 Fritzi Burr (1924–2003), American actress
 Fritzi Courtney (1923–2012), American film actress
 Fritzi Fern (1901–1932), American film actress
 Fritzi Gordon (died 1992), Austrian-born British bridge player
 Fritzi Haberlandt (born 1975), German actress
 Friederike Fritzi Löwy (1910–1994), Austrian swimmer
 Fritzi Massary (1882–1969), Austrian-American actress and soprano singer born Friederike Massaryk
 Fredericka Fritzi Ridgeway (1898–1961), American actress of the silent era
 Friederike Fritzi Scheff (1879–1954), American actress and singer
 Friederike Fritzi Schwingl (1921–2016), Austrian slalom and sprint canoer

Fictional characters
 the title character of Fritzi Ritz, an American comic strip (1922–1968)
The title character of the 2019 animated film Fritzi – A Revolutionary Tale based on the children's book Fritzi Was There.

See also
 

Feminine given names
Hypocorisms